Blue Ridge Farm, also known as Alton Park, is a historic estate located near Greenwood, Albemarle County, Virginia. The main residence consists of a 2 1/2-half-story, five-bay brick center section built in the mid-19th century, with two asymmetrical brick wings designed by William Lawrence Bottomley and added in 1923–1924. The center section has a steeply pitched gambrel roof with a balustraded deck and parapet ends.  The exterior and nearly all of the interior appointments are executed in the Georgian Revival style. The gardens were designed by noted landscape architect Charles Gillette.

It was added to the National Register of Historic Places in 1991.

References

External links
Garden and Gun: "Gillette's Gem"

Houses on the National Register of Historic Places in Virginia
Georgian Revival architecture in Virginia
Houses completed in 1924
Houses in Albemarle County, Virginia
National Register of Historic Places in Albemarle County, Virginia